Eldar Šehić (born 28 April 2000) is a Bosnian professional footballer who plays as a left back for club Karviná and the Bosnia and Herzegovina U21 national team.

Šehić started his professional career at Željezničar, who loaned him to TOŠK Tešanj in 2019.

Club career

Željezničar
Šehić started playing football at his hometown club Sarajevo, which he left in February 2016 to join Olimpic's youth setup. In July, he joined Željezničar's youth academy. On 17 July 2018, he signed his first professional contract with the team. He made his professional against Čelik Zenica on 29 July at the age of 18.

In February 2019, Šehić was sent on a six-month loan to TOŠK Tešanj. In July, his loan was extended for an additional season, but he was recalled in November. On 15 September, he scored his first professional goal against Metalleghe-BSI.

In June 2021, Šehić left Željezničar.

Personal life
Eldar is the younger brother of Benjamin who currently plays for First League of BH club Radnik Hadžići.

International career
Šehić represented Bosnia and Herzegovina on various youth levels.

Career statistics

Club

References

External links

2000 births
Living people
Footballers from Sarajevo
Bosniaks of Bosnia and Herzegovina
Bosnia and Herzegovina Muslims
Bosnia and Herzegovina footballers
Bosnia and Herzegovina youth international footballers
Bosnia and Herzegovina under-21 international footballers
Association football fullbacks
FK Željezničar Sarajevo players
NK TOŠK Tešanj players
Premier League of Bosnia and Herzegovina players
First League of the Federation of Bosnia and Herzegovina players
MFK Karviná players
FC Baník Ostrava players